Longère is the name (la longère in French) for a long, narrow dwelling, developing along the axis of its peak, typically inhabited by farmers and artisans and typical of the regions of Brittany and Normandy in northwestern France.

Meanings

Longère also means a "long wall" or "gutter wall" of a building, whether for a church or house, in Lower Brittany.

See also

 Dartmoor longhouse
 Longhouse
 Longhouses of the indigenous peoples of North America
 Neolithic long house
 Housebarn
 Quistinic
 Manoir de Mézarnou
 Moulin d'Olivet

References

House types
Architecture in France
Buildings and structures in Normandy
Brittany